Catocala inconstans is a moth in the family Erebidae first described by Arthur Gardiner Butler in 1889. It is found in Himachal Pradesh, India.

References

inconstans
Moths described in 1889
Moths of Asia
Taxa named by Arthur Gardiner Butler